A street clock or post clock is a clock mounted on top of a post typically installed in a streetscape or other urban or park setting.

History

A less common kind of street clock can be found on Maiden Lane in Manhattan, New York. In the late 19th century, William Barthman Jewelers had a clock embedded in the sidewalk. , the clock remains visible and maintained.

Street clock manufacturers in the United States included:
Brown Street Clock Company, of Monessen, Pennsylvania
Seth Thomas Clock Company

Examples

See also
Clock tower

References

Clock designs
Street furniture